Zhang Xiaonan (born 21 July 1992) is a Chinese modern pentathlete. She competed at the 2016 Summer Olympics and the 2020 Summer Olympics.

References

External links 
 

1992 births
Living people
Chinese female modern pentathletes
Modern pentathletes at the 2016 Summer Olympics
Modern pentathletes at the 2020 Summer Olympics
Olympic modern pentathletes of China
20th-century Chinese women
21st-century Chinese women